The Montserrat United Workers' Movement (MWUM) was a political party in Montserrat led by Kenneth Allen.

History
The party was established in 1961. In the elections later that year it won two of the seven seats in the Legislative Council; Allen lost in the Plymouth constituency, but M Dyer won in Southern and J W Allen won in Northern. However, it did not contest any further elections.

References

Defunct political parties in Montserrat
1961 establishments in Montserrat
Political parties established in 1961